This is a list of films released in 1994. The top worldwide grosser was The Lion King, becoming the highest-grossing animated film of all-time, although it was slightly overtaken at the North American domestic box office by Forrest Gump, which won the Academy Award for Best Picture.

Metro-Goldwyn-Mayer celebrated its 70th anniversary in 1994.

Highest-grossing films

The top 10 films released in 1994 by worldwide gross are as follows:

Events
February 15 - Viacom acquired 50.1% of Paramount Communications Inc. for $9.75 billion, following a five-month battle with QVC.
March 21 - Steven Spielberg wins his first Academy Award for Best Director for Schindler's List.
April 14 - Gone with the Wind becomes the first movie ever to air on the cable channel Turner Classic Movies.
June 7 - Pierce Brosnan is officially announced as the fifth actor to play James Bond.
June 10 - Speed is released, becoming one of the top grossing films of the year. As well as launching Keanu Reeves and Sandra Bullock into superstardom.
June 15 - The Lion King opens in New York and Los Angeles and goes on to become Buena Vista's highest-grossing film and the highest-grossing animated film.
July 1 - Val Kilmer is officially announced as the next actor to portray Batman following the abrupt departure of Michael Keaton.
July 6 - Forrest Gump is released and becomes Paramount Pictures' highest-grossing film of all-time.
December 29 - Buena Vista Pictures Distribution becomes the first distributor to have grosses in the United States and Canada in a year exceed $1 billion.

Awards

1994 wide-release films

January–March

April–June

July–September

October–December

Notable films released in 1994
United States unless stated

#
1942: A Love Story, starring Anil Kapoor and Jackie Shroff – (India)
71 Fragments of a Chronology of Chance (71 Fragmente einer Chronologie des Zufalls), directed by Michael Haneke – (Austria)
8 Seconds, starring Luke Perry, Stephen Baldwin, Cynthia Gibb

A
Above the Rim, starring Duane Martin and Tupac Shakur
Accumulator 1 (Akumulator 1) – (Czech Republic)
The Accused Uncle Shangang (Bei gao Shangang ye) – (China)
Ace Ventura: Pet Detective, directed by Tom Shadyac, starring Jim Carrey, Courteney Cox, Sean Young
The Act in Question (El Acto en cuestión) – (Argentina)
The Adventures of Priscilla, Queen of the Desert, starring Terence Stamp, Hugo Weaving, Guy Pearce – (Australia)
Africa: The Serengeti
The Air Up There, starring Kevin Bacon
Airheads, starring Steve Buscemi, Adam Sandler, Brendan Fraser
Amaidhi Padai, starring Satyaraj – (India)(logan)1994 aMSM
Amateur, starring Isabelle Huppert – (UK/US/France)
Andaz Apna Apna, directed by Rajkumar Santoshi – starring Aamir Khan, Salman Khan- (India)
Andre, starring Keith Carradine
Angel Dust, directed by Sogo Ishii – (Japan)
Angels in the Outfield, directed by William Dear, starring Danny Glover, Tony Danza, Joseph Gordon-Levitt, Christopher Lloyd
A.P.E.X.
Ashes of Time (Dung che sai duk), directed by Wong Kar-wai, starring Leslie Cheung, Maggie Cheung, Tony Leung – (Hong Kong)
Assia and the Hen with the Golden Eggs (Kurochka Ryaba), directed by Andrei Konchalovsky – (Russia)

B
Bab El-Oued City – (Algeria)
Baby's Day Out, starring Joe Mantegna, Lara Flynn Boyle, Joe Pantoliano
Backbeat, a Beatles biopic starring Stephen Dorff – (U.K./Germany)
Bad Girls, starring Madeleine Stowe, Mary Stuart Masterson, Andie MacDowell, Drew Barrymore
Bandit Queen, directed by Shekhar Kapur – (India)
Barcelona, starring Taylor Nichols and Mira Sorvino
Barnabo of the Mountains (Barnabo delle montagne) – (Italy)
Before the Rain (Pred doždot) – (Macedonia) – Golden Lion Award
Beverly Hills Cop III, directed by John Landis, starring Eddie Murphy, Judge Reinhold, Héctor Elizondo, Alan Young
Der bewegte Mann (Maybe, Maybe Not) – (Germany)
Black Beauty, starring Alan Cumming and Sean Bean – (UK/US)
Blank Check, directed by Rupert Wainwright, starring Brian Bonsall, Karen Duffy, and Miguel Ferrer
Blankman, starring Damon Wayans and David Alan Grier
Blink, directed by Michael Apted, starring Madeleine Stowe and Aidan Quinn
Blown Away, directed by Stephen Hopkins, starring Jeff Bridges, Tommy Lee Jones, Forest Whitaker, Suzy Amis, Lloyd Bridges
Blue Chips, directed by William Friedkin, starring Nick Nolte, Mary McDonnell, J. T. Walsh, Ed O'Neill, Shaquille O'Neal
Blue Sky, directed by Tony Richardson, starring Jessica Lange, Tommy Lee Jones, Powers Boothe
Body Without Soul (Tělo bez duše) – (Czech Republic)
Brainscan, starring Edward Furlong
The Broken Journey (Uttoran), directed by Sandip Ray – (India)
The Browning Version, directed by Mike Figgis, starring Albert Finney and Greta Scacchi – (U.K.)
Bullets over Broadway, directed by Woody Allen, starring John Cusack, Dianne Wiest, Jennifer Tilly, Chazz Palminteri
Burnt by the Sun (Utomlyonnye solntsem) – (Russia/France) – Academy Award for Best Foreign Language Film

C
A Caixa (The Box) – (Portugal)
Camilla, starring Jessica Tandy and Bridget Fonda
Camp Nowhere, starring Christopher Lloyd and Jonathan Jackson
Captives, starring Tim Roth – (U.K.)
"Cemetery Man"
C'est la vie, mon chéri (Xīn bùliǎo qíng) – (Hong Kong)
The Chase, starring Charlie Sheen and Kristy Swanson
Chasers, starring Tom Berenger, William McNamara, Erika Eleniak
China Moon, starring Ed Harris and Madeleine Stowe
A Chinese Odyssey (Sai yau gei) – (Hong Kong)
Chungking Express, directed by Wong Kar-wai, starring Tony Leung – (Hong Kong)
City Slickers II: The Legend of Curly's Gold, starring Billy Crystal, Daniel Stern, Jon Lovitz, Jack Palance
Clean, Shaven
Clean Slate, starring Dana Carvey and Valeria Golino
Clear and Present Danger, starring Harrison Ford, Willem Dafoe, Harris Yulin, Anne Archer, James Earl Jones, Joaquim de Almeida
Clerks, directed by Kevin Smith
The Client, directed by Joel Schumacher, starring Susan Sarandon, Tommy Lee Jones, Brad Renfro
Clifford, starring Martin Short, Charles Grodin, Mary Steenburgen, Dabney Coleman
Cobb, directed by Ron Shelton, starring Tommy Lee Jones and Robert Wuhl
Color of Night, directed by Richard Rush, starring Bruce Willis, Jane March, Rubén Blades, Lesley Ann Warren, Scott Bakula, Brad Dourif
Colonel Chabert, starring Gérard Depardieu and Fanny Ardant – (France)
The Confessional – (Canada/France/U.K.)
A Confucian Confusion (Duli Shidai) – (Taiwan)
Cops & Robbersons, starring Chevy Chase and Jack Palance
Corrina, Corrina, starring Whoopi Goldberg, Ray Liotta, Tina Majorino
Country Life, starring Sam Neill and Greta Scacchi – (Australia)
The Cowboy Way, starring Woody Harrelson, Kiefer Sutherland, Dylan McDermott, Marg Helgenberger
Crackerjack, starring Nastassja Kinski, Thomas Ian Griffith, Christopher Plummer
Criminal, directed by Mahesh Bhatt – (India/India)
Crooklyn, directed by Spike Lee, starring Alfre Woodard, Delroy Lindo, Isaiah Washington
The Crow, starring Brandon Lee
Crumb, a documentary directed by Terry Zwigoff

D
D2: The Mighty Ducks, directed by Sam Weisman, starring Emilio Estevez, Joshua Jackson, Kathryn Erbe
Dance Me Outside – (Canada)
Deadly Advice, starring Jane Horrocks, Imelda Staunton, Jonathan Pryce – (U.K.)
Deadly Target
Dear Goddamned Friends (Cari fottutissimi amici), directed by Mario Monicelli – (Italy)
Death and the Maiden, directed by Roman Polanski, starring Sigourney Weaver and Ben Kingsley – (US/UK/France)
Death Wish V: The Face of Death, starring Charles Bronson (in his final Hollywood film), Lesley-Anne Down, Michael Parks
Dias contados (Running Out of Time), directed by Imanol Uribe – (Spain)
Disclosure, directed by Barry Levinson, starring Michael Douglas, Demi Moore, Donald Sutherland, Rosemary Forsyth, Dennis Miller
Double Happiness (Bonheur aigre-doux), starring Sandra Oh – (Canada)
Dream Lover, starring James Spader and Mädchen Amick
Drohkaal (Times of Betrayal), starring Om Puri and Naseeruddin Shah – (India)
Drop Zone, starring Wesley Snipes and Gary Busey
Drunken Master II (Jui Kuen II), starring Jackie Chan – (Hong Kong)
Du Pappa (Daddy Blue) – (Norway)
Dumb and Dumber, directed by the Farrelly brothers, starring Jim Carrey, Jeff Daniels, Lauren Holly

E
Eat Drink Man Woman (Yin shi nan nu), directed by Ang Lee – (Taiwan)
Ed Wood, directed by Tim Burton, starring Johnny Depp, Martin Landau, Sarah Jessica Parker, Patricia Arquette, Lisa Marie, Bill Murray
Eden Valley – (U.K.)
L'Enfer (Hell), directed by Claude Chabrol, starring Emmanuelle Béart and François Cluzet – (France)
Ermo, directed by Zhou Xiaowen – (Hong Kong/China)
Even Cowgirls Get the Blues, directed by Gus Van Sant, starring Uma Thurman, Lorraine Bracco, Angie Dickinson
Everynight ... Everynight – (Australia)
Exit to Eden, directed by Garry Marshall, starring Dana Delany, Paul Mercurio, Rosie O'Donnell, Dan Aykroyd
Exotica, directed by Atom Egoyan, starring Mia Kirshner, Elias Koteas, Bruce Greenwood – (Canada)

F
Farinelli Il Castrato – (Italy/Belgium/France) – Golden Globe Award for Best Foreign Language Film
Faust – (Czech Republic)
 Fast Getaway II
The Favor, starring Harley Jane Kozak, Elizabeth McGovern, Bill Pullman, Ken Wahl, Brad Pitt
Felidae – (Germany)
Five-Star Thieves, directed by Ashraf Fahmy, starring Salah Zulfikar – (Egypt)
Fist of Legend (Jing wu ying xiong), starring Jet Li – (Hong Kong)
The Flintstones, directed by Brian Levant, starring John Goodman, Elizabeth Perkins, Rick Moranis, Rosie O'Donnell, Kyle MacLachlan, Halle Berry, Elizabeth Taylor
Forrest Gump, directed by Robert Zemeckis, starring Tom Hanks, Robin Wright, Gary Sinise, Mykelti Williamson, Sally Field – Academy Award for Best Picture and Golden Globe Award for Best Motion Picture (Drama)
Four Weddings and a Funeral, directed by Mike Newell, starring Hugh Grant and Andie MacDowell – (U.K.)
The Fox with Nine Tails (Gumiho) – (South Korea)
Fresh, starring Sean Nelson, Giancarlo Esposito
From Beijing With Love (Guóchǎn Líng Líng Qī) – (Hong Kong)
F.T.W., starring Mickey Rourke and Lori Singer

G
Gary Larson's Tales From the Far Side
The Getaway, starring Alec Baldwin, Kim Basinger, Michael Madsen, Jennifer Tilly, Philip Seymour Hoffman, James Woods
Getting Even with Dad, starring Macaulay Culkin, Ted Danson, Glenne Headly
God Wants Me to Forgive Them!?!
Godzilla vs. SpaceGodzilla (Gojira tai SupēsuGojira) – (Japan)
Golden Gate, directed by John Madden, starring Matt Dillon, Joan Chen, Bruno Kirby, Teri Polo
A Good Man in Africa, starring Sean Connery – (South Africa/United States)
The Good Old Daze (Le péril jeune), directed by Cédric Klapisch – (France)
The Great Conqueror's Concubine (Xi chu bawang) – (Hong Kong)
Greedy, starring Michael J. Fox, Kirk Douglas, Nancy Travis, Ed Begley Jr., Bob Balaban, Olivia d'Abo
Guarding Tess, starring Shirley MacLaine, Nicolas Cage, Richard Griffiths, Austin Pendleton, Edward Albert
Gunsmoke: One Man's Justice, starring James Arness, Bruce Boxleitner, Amy Stoch, Alan Scarfe, Christopher Bradley, Hallie Foote, Don Collier

H
Hated: GG Allin and the Murder Junkies
He's a Woman, She's a Man (Gam chi yuk yip), starring Leslie Cheung and Anita Yuen – (Hong Kong)
The Heart's Cry (Le Cri du coeur) – (Burkina Faso/France)
Heavenly Creatures, directed by Peter Jackson, starring Melanie Lynskey and Kate Winslet – (New Zealand)
Hello Cinema (Salaam Cinema) – (Iran)
Highlander III: The Sorcerer – (Canada/France/U.K.)
Hoop Dreams, documentary on high school basketball
The Hudsucker Proxy, directed by Joel and Ethan Coen, starring Tim Robbins, Jennifer Jason Leigh, Paul Newman
Hum Aapke Hain Koun..! (Who am I to You..!) – (India)

I
I Can't Sleep (J'ai pas sommeil) – (France)
I Have a Date with Spring (Wo he chun tian you ge yue hui) – (Hong Kong)
I Love Trouble, starring Julia Roberts and Nick Nolte
I.Q., directed by Fred Schepisi, starring Tim Robbins, Meg Ryan, Walter Matthau, Stephen Fry
I'll Do Anything, directed by James L. Brooks, starring Nick Nolte, Albert Brooks, Julie Kavner, Joely Richardson, Tracey Ullman
Illegal In Blue
Imaginary Crimes, starring Harvey Keitel and Fairuza Balk
Immortal Beloved, starring Gary Oldman and Jeroen Krabbé – (UK/US)
In the Heat of the Sun (Yángguāng cànlàn de rìzi) – (China)
The Inkwell, starring Larenz Tate and Joe Morton
Intersection, starring Richard Gere, Sharon Stone, Lolita Davidovich
Interview with the Vampire: The Vampire Chronicles, starring Tom Cruise, Brad Pitt, Kirsten Dunst, Antonio Banderas, Christian Slater
Iron Will, starring Mackenzie Astin and Kevin Spacey
It Could Happen To You, starring Nicolas Cage, Bridget Fonda, Rosie Perez
It's Pat, starring Julia Sweeney

J
Jason's Lyric, starring Jada Pinkett Smith
Jimmy Hollywood, directed by Barry Levinson, starring Joe Pesci and Christian Slater
Johnnie Waterman (Jańcio Wodnik) – (Poland)
Junior, directed by Ivan Reitman, starring Arnold Schwarzenegger, Danny DeVito, Emma Thompson

K
Killing Zoe, directed by Roger Avary, starring Julie Delpy and Eric Stoltz
Krantiveer, starring Nana Patekar and Dimple Kapadia – (India)

L
Ladybird, Ladybird, directed by Ken Loach – (U.K.)
Lamerica – (Italy)
The Land Before Time II: The Great Valley Adventure
Lassie, starring Helen Slater
The Last Seduction, directed by John Dahl, starring Linda Fiorentino, Peter Berg, Bill Pullman
The Last Supper, directed by Cynthia Roberts – (Canada)
Legends of the Fall, directed by Edward Zwick, starring Brad Pitt, Anthony Hopkins, Julia Ormond, Henry Thomas, Aidan Quinn
Léon: The Professional, directed by Luc Besson, starring Jean Reno, Gary Oldman and Natalie Portman – (France)
Lightning Jack, starring Paul Hogan – (United States/Australia)
The Lion King, directed by Roger Allers and Rob Minkoff, voices of Matthew Broderick, Jeremy Irons – Golden Globe Award for Best Picture (Musical or Comedy)
Lisbon Story, directed by Wim Wenders – (Germany/Portugal/Spain)
Little Big League, starring Dennis Farina, Timothy Busfield, Luke Edwards, Jason Robards
Little Buddha, directed by Bernardo Bertolucci, starring Keanu Reeves, Chris Isaak, Bridget Fonda
Little Giants, starring Rick Moranis and Ed O'Neill
Little Odessa, starring Tim Roth and Edward Furlong
The Little Rascals, directed by Penelope Spheeris
Little Women, starring Winona Ryder, Claire Danes, Kirsten Dunst
Love Affair, starring Warren Beatty, Annette Bening, Pierce Brosnan, Garry Shandling, Katharine Hepburn
Love and a .45, starring Gil Bellows and Renée Zellweger
Love on Delivery (Poh waai ji wong), starring Stephen Chow – (Hong Kong)
A Low Down Dirty Shame, starring Keenen Ivory Wayans

M
Madagascar – (Cuba)
The Madness of King George, directed by Nicholas Hytner, starring Nigel Hawthorne and Helen Mirren – (U.K.)
Major League II, directed by David S. Ward, starring Charlie Sheen, Tom Berenger, Corbin Bernsen, Dennis Haysbert, Omar Epps
A Man of No Importance, starring Albert Finney – (Ireland/U.K.)
Mary Shelley's Frankenstein, directed by and starring Kenneth Branagh, with Robert De Niro, Helena Bonham Carter
The Mask, directed by Chuck Russell, starring Jim Carrey and Cameron Diaz
The Master and Margarita (Мастер и Маргарита) – (Russia)
Maverick, directed by Richard Donner, starring Mel Gibson, Jodie Foster, James Garner, Alfred Molina, James Coburn
Men of War, starring Dolph Lundgren
Midnight Man
Milk Money, starring Melanie Griffith and Ed Harris
A Million to Juan, starring Polly Draper and Paul Rodriguez
Miracle on 34th Street, starring Richard Attenborough, Elizabeth Perkins, Dylan McDermott, Mara Wilson
Mixed Nuts, directed by Nora Ephron, starring Steve Martin, Rita Wilson, Madeline Kahn, Adam Sandler, Anthony LaPaglia, Juliette Lewis
The Monster (Il Mostro), directed by and starring Roberto Benigni – (Italy)
Mother's Boys, starring Jamie Lee Curtis, Peter Gallagher, Joanne Whalley
Mrs. Parker and the Vicious Circle, starring Jennifer Jason Leigh, Matthew Broderick, Campbell Scott
Muriel's Wedding, starring Toni Collette – (Australia/France)
My Girl 2, starring Anna Chlumsky, Dan Aykroyd, Jamie Lee Curtis, Austin O'Brien

N
Naked Gun : The Final Insult, starring Leslie Nielsen, Priscilla Presley, George Kennedy, Fred Ward, O. J. Simpson, Anna Nicole Smith
Natural Born Killers, directed by Oliver Stone, starring Woody Harrelson, Juliette Lewis, Robert Downey Jr., Tom Sizemore, Tommy Lee Jones, Rodney Dangerfield
Nell, directed by Michael Apted, starring Jodie Foster, Liam Neeson, Natasha Richardson
The NeverEnding Story III
The Next Karate Kid, starring Hilary Swank and Pat Morita
Nightwatch (Nattevagten) – (Denmark)
No Dessert, Dad, till You Mow the Lawn, starring Robert Hays
No Escape, starring Ray Liotta
Nobody's Fool, directed by Robert Benton, starring Paul Newman, Bruce Willis, Melanie Griffith, Dylan Walsh, Jessica Tandy
North, directed by Rob Reiner, starring Elijah Wood and Bruce Willis

O
Oleanna, directed by David Mamet, starring William H. Macy and Debra Eisenstadt
On Deadly Ground, starring Steven Seagal, Michael Caine, Joan Chen
Once Were Warriors, directed by Lee Tamahori – (New Zealand)
Only You, directed by Norman Jewison, starring Marisa Tomei, Robert Downey Jr., Bonnie Hunt
Orochi, the Eight-Headed Dragon (Yamato Takeru) – (Japan)

P
PCU, starring Jeremy Piven, Jon Favreau, David Spade
The Pagemaster, directed by Joe Johnston (live action), starring Macaulay Culkin and Christopher Lloyd
The Paper, directed by Ron Howard, starring Michael Keaton, Glenn Close, Randy Quaid, Marisa Tomei, Robert Duvall
The Patriots (Les Patriotes) – (France)
Phantasm III: Lord of the Dead
Pontiac Moon, starring Ted Danson and Mary Steenburgen
Police Academy: Mission to Moscow 
The Postman (Il Postino), directed by Michael Radford, starring Philippe Noiret – (Italy)
Prêt-à-Porter, directed by Robert Altman, starring Sophia Loren, Marcello Mastroianni, Tim Robbins, Julia Roberts, Forest Whitaker
Priest, starring Linus Roache and Tom Wilkinson – (U.K.)
Princess Caraboo, starring Phoebe Cates – (UK/US)
Pulp Fiction, directed by Quentin Tarantino, starring John Travolta, Samuel L. Jackson, Bruce Willis, Ving Rhames, Uma Thurman – Palme d'Or award
The Puppet Masters, starring Donald Sutherland
A Pure Formality (Una Pura Formalità), starring Gérard Depardieu and Roman Polanski – (Italy)

Q
Queen Margot (La Reine Margot), starring Isabelle Adjani and Daniel Auteuil – (France)
The Queen of the Night (La reina de la noche) – (Mexico)
Quiz Show, directed by Robert Redford, starring Rob Morrow, John Turturro, Ralph Fiennes, Paul Scofield

R
Radio Inside, starring William McNamara and Elisabeth Shue
Radioland Murders, starring Mary Stuart Masterson and Brian Benben
Rapa-Nui, starring Jason Scott Lee and Esai Morales
Reality Bites, directed by and starring Ben Stiller, with Winona Ryder, Ethan Hawke, Janeane Garofalo, Steve Zahn
Red Firecracker, Green Firecracker (Pao da shuang deng) – (China)
Red Rose White Rose (Hong mei gui bai mei gui), starring Joan Chen – (Hong Kong)
The Ref, directed by Ted Demme, starring Denis Leary, Judy Davis, Kevin Spacey
Renaissance Man, directed by Penny Marshall, starring Danny DeVito, Gregory Hines, Lillo Brancato, Jr., Mark Wahlberg
The Return of Jafar
The Return of Tommy Tricker
Rice People (Neak sri) (Cambodia)
Richie Rich, starring Macaulay Culkin
The River Wild, directed by Curtis Hanson, starring Meryl Streep, Kevin Bacon, David Strathairn, John C. Reilly
The Road to Wellville, directed by Alan Parker, starring Anthony Hopkins, Matthew Broderick, John Cusack, Lara Flynn Boyle, Bridget Fonda, Dana Carvey
The Jungle Book, directed by Stephen Sommers, starring Jason Scott Lee

S
S.F.W., starring Stephen Dorff and Reese Witherspoon
Safe Passage, starring Susan Sarandon and Nick Stahl
Sailor Moon S: The Movie – (Japan)
Sátántangó, directed by Béla Tarr
The Santa Clause, directed by John Pasquin, starring Tim Allen
The Scout, directed by Michael Ritchie, starring Albert Brooks, Brendan Fraser, Dianne Wiest
The Search for One-eye Jimmy, starring Sam Rockwell, John Turturro, Steve Buscemi, Samuel L. Jackson, Jennifer Beals
Second Best, directed by Chris Menges, starring William Hurt, John Hurt, Jane Horrocks – (U.K.)
The Secret of Roan Inish, directed by John Sayles – (United States/Ireland)
La Séparation, starring Isabelle Huppert, Daniel Auteuil – (France)
Serial Mom, directed by John Waters, starring Kathleen Turner, Sam Waterston, Ricki Lake, Matthew Lillard
The Shadow, starring Alec Baldwin, John Lone, Penelope Ann Miller
Shallow Grave, directed by Danny Boyle, starring Christopher Eccleston and Ewan McGregor – (U.K.)
The Shawshank Redemption, directed by Frank Darabont, starring Tim Robbins, Morgan Freeman, Bob Gunton, Clancy Brown, James Whitmore
Sh'Chur – (Israel)
The Silences of the Palace (Samt el qusur) – (Tunisia)
Silent Fall, starring Richard Dreyfuss, Liv Tyler, Linda Hamilton, John Lithgow, J. T. Walsh
A Simple Twist of Fate, starring Steve Martin, Gabriel Byrne, Laura Linney, Catherine O'Hara
Sioux City, starring Lou Diamond Phillips
Sirens, starring Hugh Grant, Tara Fitzgerald, Elle Macpherson, Portia de Rossi – (Australia/U.K.)
Sleep with Me, starring Meg Tilly, Craig Sheffer, Eric Stoltz
Some Folks Call it a Sling Blade, a short film starring Billy Bob Thornton
A Soul Haunted by Painting (Hua hun), starring Gong Li – (China)
The Specialist, starring Sylvester Stallone, Sharon Stone, James Woods, Eric Roberts, Rod Steiger
Speechless, starring Michael Keaton, Geena Davis, Christopher Reeve
Speed, directed by Jan de Bont, starring Keanu Reeves, Dennis Hopper, Jeff Daniels, Sandra Bullock
Squanto: A Warrior's Tale
Star Trek Generations, starring Patrick Stewart, William Shatner, Malcolm McDowell, Alan Ruck, Whoopi Goldberg
Stargate, starring Kurt Russell and James Spader
Street Fighter, starring Jean-Claude Van Damme and Raul Julia
Sugar Hill, starring Wesley Snipes
The Sum of Us, starring Russell Crowe and Jack Thompson – (Australia)
Surviving the Game, starring Ice-T, Rutger Hauer, Charles S. Dutton, F. Murray Abraham, Gary Busey
The Swan Princess, directed by Richard Rich
Swimming with Sharks, starring Kevin Spacey, Frank Whaley, Michelle Forbes

T
The Taebaek Mountains (Taebaek Sanmaek) – (South Korea)
Terminal Velocity, starring Charlie Sheen and Nastassja Kinski
Thanks for Every New Morning (Díky za každé nové ráno) – (Czech Republic)
Three Colors: White – 2nd of the Krzysztof Kieślowski trilogy, starring Zbigniew Zamachowski and Julie Delpy – (Poland/France/Switzerland)
Three Colors: Red – 3rd of the Krzysztof Kieślowski trilogy, starring Irène Jacob and Jean-Louis Trintignant – (Poland/France/Switzerland)
Threesome, starring Lara Flynn Boyle, Stephen Baldwin and Josh Charles
Through the Olive Trees (Zire darakhatan zeyton), directed by Abbas Kiarostami – (Iran)
Thumbelina, directed by Don Bluth and Gary Goldman
Time Chasers
Timecop, starring Jean-Claude Van Damme and Mia Sara
To Live (Huózhe), directed by Zhang Yimou, starring Gong Li – (China)
Tom & Viv, starring Willem Dafoe and Miranda Richardson – (UK/US)
Total Balalaika Show, a concert film directed by Aki Kaurismäki – (Finland)
Trial by Jury, starring Joanne Whalley, Gabriel Byrne, William Hurt, Kathleen Quinlan, Armand Assante
A Troll in Central Park, directed by Don Bluth and Gary Goldman
True Lies, directed by James Cameron, starring Arnold Schwarzenegger, Jamie Lee Curtis, Tom Arnold

U
An Unforgettable Summer (Un été inoubliable) or (O vară de neuitat), starring Kristin Scott Thomas – (France/Romania)

V
Vanya on 42nd Street, directed by Louis Malle, starring Julianne Moore, Wallace Shawn, Andre Gregory
Vive L'Amour (Ai qing wan sui) – (Taiwan) – Golden Lion award

W
The War, starring Elijah Wood and Kevin Costner
War of the Buttons, directed by David Puttnam – (Ireland)
Wes Craven's New Nightmare, starring Robert Englund
Whale Music – (Canada)
When a Man Loves a Woman, starring Meg Ryan, Andy García, Philip Seymour Hoffman
White Fang 2: Myth of the White Wolf
White Mile, starring Alan Alda and Peter Gallagher
Widows' Peak, starring Mia Farrow, Natasha Richardson, Joan Plowright – (Ireland/U.K.)
Wild Reeds (Les Roseaux sauvages) – (France)
Wing Chun, starring Michelle Yeoh – (Hong Kong)
With Honors, starring Joe Pesci, Brendan Fraser, Moira Kelly, Patrick Dempsey, Josh Hamilton, Gore Vidal
Without Compassion (Sin compasión) – (Peru)
Wolf, directed by Mike Nichols, starring Jack Nicholson, Michelle Pfeiffer, James Spader
The Wooden Man's Bride (Wǔ kuí) – (China)
Wyatt Earp, directed by Lawrence Kasdan, starring Kevin Costner, Gene Hackman, Dennis Quaid, Isabella Rossellini, Mark Harmon

Births 
 January 17 – Lucy Boynton, English actress
 January 19 – Kristi Lauren, American actress
 February 10 – Makenzie Vega, American actress
 January 21 – Booboo Stewart, American actor and singer
 February 1
Julia Garner, American actress
Harry Styles, English singer and actor
 February 6 - Charlie Heaton, English actor
 February 10 - Seulgi (singer), South Korean singer, dancer and actress
 February 14
Allie Grant, American actress
Paul Butcher, American actor
 February 15 - Corinne Foxx, American model, actress and producer
 February 16 - Matthew Knight, Canadian actor
 February 21 – 
Hayley Orrantia, actress
Wendy (singer), South Korean singer, voice actress and radio host
 February 23
Dakota Fanning, American actress
James Paxton (actor), American actor
 March 3 – Lee David, South Korean actor
 March 10 - Bad Bunny, Puerto Rican rapper and singer
 March 12 - Christina Grimmie, American singer, songwriter, musician, multi instrumentalist, actress and YouTuber (d. 2016)
 March 14 – Ansel Elgort, American actor and singer
 March 21 - Jasmin Savoy Brown, American actress
 April 6 - Fabien Frankel, British actor
 April 11 - Dakota Blue Richards, English actress
 April 12 – Saoirse Ronan, Irish actress
 April 16 - Liliana Mumy, American actress
 April 18 – Moisés Arias, American actor
 April 24 - Jordan Fisher, American actor, singer and musician
 May 4 – Alexander Gould, American actor
 May 11 - David Alvarez (actor), Canadian dancer and actor
 May 24 - Cayden Boyd, American actor
 May 29 - Paloma Kwiatkowski, Canadian actress
 June 8 - Anthony Boyle, Irish actor
 June 23 - Connor Jessup, Canadian actor, writer and director
 June 24 – Erin Moriarty, American actress
 July 6 – Camilla and Rebecca Rosso, English twin actresses
 July 16 – Mark Indelicato, American actor
 July 18
Clerence Chyntia Audry, Indonesian actress (d. 2022)
Lamar Johnson (actor), Canadian actor
Lee Yoo-mi, South Korean actress
 July 23 – Kelvin Harrison Jr., American actor
 August 2 – Angus Imrie, English actor
 August 9 – Forrest Landis, American actor
 August 10 - Brigette Lundy-Paine, American actor
 August 17 – Taissa Farmiga, American actress
 August 18 - Madelaine Petsch, American actress and YouTuber
 August 21 - Jacqueline Emerson, American actress and singer
 August 22 - Israel Broussard, American actor
 August 25
Josh Flitter, American actor
Natasha Liu Bordizzo, Australian actress and model
 September 3 - María Mercedes Coroy, Guatemalan actress of Kaqchikel Maya descent
 September 7 - Kento Yamazaki, Japanese actor
 September 11 – Jordi El Niño Polla, Spanish adult film actor
 September 23 - Aurora Perrineau, American actress and model
 September 25 – Jansen Panettiere, American actor (d. 2023)
 September 29
Halsey (singer), American singer and actress
Clara Mamet, American actress and musician
 September 30 - Raphaël Coleman, English actor (d. 2020)
 October 9 - Jodelle Ferland, Canadian actress
 October 10
Kyle Allen (actor), American actor
Bae Suzy, South Korean actress and singer
 October 23 – Margaret Qualley, American actress
 November 10 – Zoey Deutch, American actress
 November 11 – Connor Price, Canadian-American actor
 November 17 – Raquel Castro, American actress
 November 22 – Dacre Montgomery, Australian actor
 December 3 – Jake T. Austin, American actor
 December 10 – Kayli Mills, American voice actress
 December 11 – Gabriel Basso, American actor
 December 15 – Emma Lockhart, American actress
 December 17 – Nat Wolff, American actor and singer
 December 26 – Samantha Boscarino, actress

Deaths

Film debuts 
Jessica Alba – Camp Nowhere
Danny Boyle (director) – Shallow Grave
Rose Byrne – Dallas Doll
Margaret Cho – Angie
Nikolaj Coster-Waldau – Nightwatch
Marion Cotillard – The Story of a Boy Who Wanted to Be Kissed
Claire Danes – Little Women
Thomas Dekker – Star Trek Generations
Emily Deschanel – It Could Happen to You
Cameron Diaz – The Mask
John DiMaggio – Pom Poko
Jennifer Ehle – Backbeat
William Fichtner – Quiz Show
Jason Flemyng – The Jungle Book
Rachel Griffiths – Muriel's Wedding
Marin Hinkle – Angie
Scarlett Johansson – North
Greg Kinnear – Blankman
Phil LaMarr – Pulp Fiction
Jude Law – Shopping
Melanie Lynskey – Heavenly Creatures
James Marsden – No Dessert, Dad, till You Mow the Lawn
Ewan McGregor – Being Human
Christopher Meloni – Clean Slate
Jonathan Rhys Meyers – A Man of No Importance
Dash Mihok – Black Is White
Jennifer Morrison – Intersection
Sandra Oh – Double Happiness
Haley Joel Osment – Forrest Gump
Michael Peña – Running Free
Natalie Portman – Léon: The Professional
Mark Ruffalo – There Goes My Baby
Will Sasso – Ski School 2 
Liev Schreiber – Mixed Nuts
Andy Serkis – Prince of Jutland
J. K. Simmons – The Ref
Sebastian Stan – 71 Fragments of a Chronology of Chance
French Stewart – Stargate
Lew Temple – Angels in the Outfield
Kenan Thompson – D2: The Mighty Ducks
Liv Tyler – Silent Fall
Alexa Vega – Little Giants
Mark Wahlberg – Renaissance Man
Rachel Weisz – Death Machine
Mae Whitman – When a Man Loves a Woman
Harland Williams – Dumb and Dumber
Michelle Williams – Lassie
Debra Wilson – Cracking Up
Kate Winslet – Heavenly Creatures
Robert Wisdom – Clean Slate
Bokeem Woodbine – Crooklyn

References

 
Film by year